The three-striped flycatcher (Conopias trivirgatus) is a species of bird in the family Tyrannidae.
It is found in Argentina, Bolivia, Brazil, Ecuador, Paraguay, Peru, and Venezuela.
Its natural habitats are subtropical or tropical moist lowland forest and subtropical or tropical swamps.

References

three-striped flycatcher
Birds of the Amazon Basin
Birds of the Atlantic Forest
three-striped flycatcher
Taxonomy articles created by Polbot